David McLeish may refer to:
 David McLeish (Australian footballer) (born 1950), Australian rules footballer
 David McLeish (rugby union) (born 1975), Scottish rugby union player